J. Press is a traditional men's clothier founded in 1902 on Yale University's campus in New Haven, Connecticut by Jacobi Press. The brand  also has stores in  New York City and Washington, D.C. In 1974, the Press family sold the rights to license J. Press for the Japanese market, making it the first American brand to be licensed in Japan. In 1986, J. Press was acquired by the Japanese apparel company Onward Kashiyama, who had previously been his licensee for 14 years. Japanese licensed distribution is roughly six times larger than the American-made J. Press. J. Press is currently part of the Onward Group (Onward Holdings, Ltd.).

Style 

Jacobi Press immigrated to the US from Latvia in 1896 and founded the company six years later.

Since its founding, J. Press' clothing has remained much the same. For example, the company produces the vast majority of its off-the-rack jackets in the traditional "three-button sack" style rarely found today in America, and for the most part, only produces plain-front trousers, for which the company suggests a traditional 1" cuff. Fabrics are generally subdued, except for traditionally bright-colored items such as casual trousers and sweaters. Its neckties bear traditional repp stripe, foulard, and paisley motifs.  They also carry scarves and ties featuring motifs and colors for Ivy League schools, including Yale's Skull and Bones Society.  J. Press dress overcoats are of lambswool, cashmere, or camel hair, or of herringbone tweed with a velvet collar in the Chesterfield style.

J. Press is said to carry on a traditional Ivy League style of men's clothing. J. Press caters most to an old-fashioned preppy subculture that eschews popular culture trends. The company makes an effort not to outsource the production of its clothing to developing countries or to use synthetic materials in its line.

Stores
The New Haven store was originally built in 1863 in the French Second Empire style as a residence for Cornelius Pierpont, a prominent local grocer.  It was irreparably damaged by Winter Storm Nemo in February 2013; the company is temporarily renting a store at 260 College St., across from the Shubert Theatre.

In 1912, the company opened a store in New York “appropriately equidistant from the Yale and Harvard Clubs.”

In May 2007, J. Press moved to 380 Madison Avenue in New York City, which closed indefinitely in 2014.

On March 1, 2013, J. Press opened another store in New York located at 304 Bleecker Street, which carried a sub-label of the brand called “J. Press York Street,” that was described by the New York Times as “a faint outline of the original.” Designed by Shimon and Ariel Ovadia of the clothing brand Ovadia & Sons, York Street was geared towards a younger audience. After four seasons, Shimon and Ariel Ovadia left York Street and it was merged into mainline J. Press and renamed “J. Press Blue.”

In October 2017, J. Press closed the York Street store and opened a new store in midtown Manhattan, in the same building as the Yale Club. The store was expected to generate 25% of U.S. sales. J Press has been constructing a new larger four story retail storefront at the original 260 York St., New Haven location.

J. Press formerly had branches in Cambridge, Massachusetts (closed in August 2018 after 86 years), San Francisco, California and Princeton, New Jersey.

See also
Brooks Brothers
Ivy League (clothes)
Paul Stuart

References

External links
J. Press (Official U.S. website)

Clothing brands of the United States
Clothing retailers of the United States
American companies established in 1902
Clothing companies established in 1902
Retail companies established in 1902
Companies based in New York City
Suit makers
1902 establishments in Connecticut
1900s fashion